Pompanin is an Italian surname. Notable people with the surname include:

Dino Pompanin (1930–2015), Italian alpine skier
Rosa Pompanin (born 1984), Italian curler
Sergio Pompanin (born 1939), Italian bobsledder

Italian-language surnames